Ding Baozhen (1820–1886), courtesy name Weihuang, was a Chinese official who lived in the late Qing dynasty and served as the governor of Sichuan Province.

The Sichuan dish Kung Pao chicken (or Gongbao chicken) was named after his nickname, "Ding Gongbao". "Gongbao" was the short form of an appointment he held, "Taizi Shaobao" (太子少保; roughly translates to "Crown Prince's Tutor"), while "Ding" was his family name.

Life
Born in Pingyuan, Guizhou Province in 1820, Ding was appointed a government official in 1854 after an outstanding performance in the annual imperial examination. He served as head of Shandong Province and later as governor of Sichuan province. In the second year of the Guangxu period in the Qing dynasty, he supervised the reconstruction of the Dujiangyan Irrigation Project. A statue of him is displayed at Erwang Temple in Dujiangyan City.

References

Further reading

1820 births
1886 deaths
People from Bijie
Qing dynasty politicians from Guizhou
Governors of Sichuan
Political office-holders in Hunan
Political office-holders in Shandong
Viceroys of Sichuan